Königsbrück (Upper Sorbian: Kinspork) is a town in the Bautzen district, in Saxony, Germany. Königsbrück is known as the western gate of the historic Upper Lusatia region.

History

First mentioned in 1248 the settlement arose around a fortress in the Bohemian crown land of Upper Lusatia where the Via Regia trade route crossed the border with the Margraviate of Meissen. First mentioned as a town in 1331, Königsbrück from 1562 was the administrative centre of a Bohemian state country (Freie Standesherrschaft), which passed under the suzerainty of the Saxon Electorate according to the 1635 Peace of Prague. In 1906 the Kingdom of Saxony had large proving grounds laid out for the XII (1st Royal Saxon) Corps stationed at Dresden, that after World War II were used by the Soviet Army and finally closed in 1992.

Transport
Königsbrück railway station is located south of the town centre. There are hourly passenger services to Ottendorf-Okrilla and Dresden.

Notable people

Georg Bartisch (1535–1607), physician, ophthalmologist and urologist
Marvin Stefaniak (born 1995), footballer

References 

 
West Lusatia
Populated places in Bautzen (district)